Baloncesto Rivas CDE, commonly known as Rivas Ecópolis due to sponsorship reasons, is a Spanish professional women's basketball team based in Rivas-Vaciamadrid, Community of Madrid.

History
Baloncesto Rivas was founded in 1988 as CD Covíbar but the women's basketball team didn't play until 1993.

Rivas first played in the top category in 2004, but it couldn't avoid relegation. However the team was back for the 2007 season and rose into the championship's top places, attaining 3rd (2009, 2010) and 4th (2011) spots. These results earned Rivas qualification for the Euroleague, where it reached the Round of 16 in 2010 and 2011. In 2011 it won the Copa de la Reina, its first national title.

In 2012, Rivas achieved a berth to the Euroleague Women Final Eight at Istanbul, where it finished runner-up after being defeated in the final game by Ros Casares Valencia.

Three years later, in 2015, the club resigns to continue playing in Liga Femenina and came back to the second division. On 17 July 2017, the club decided to dissolve definitively the senior team due to the lack of sponsorship, thus competing only with the youth teams.

Sponsorship naming
Rivas Ciudad del Deporte 2000–2002
Rivas Futura 2002–2008
Rivas Ecópolis 2008–2015
Rivas Promete 2015–2016
Rivas Ecópolis 2016–

Season by season

Titles
 1 Liga Femenina (2013–14)
 2 Copa de la Reina (2011, 2013)

Record in European Competitions
 Euroleague
 2010: Round of 16
 2011: Round of 16
 2012: Runner-up
 Eurocup
 2009: Round of 32

See also
 Liga Femenina de Baloncesto

References

External links
 Official website

Liga Femenina de Baloncesto teams
Women's basketball teams in Spain
Basketball teams established in 1993
EuroLeague Women clubs
Basketball teams in the Community of Madrid
Rivas-Vaciamadrid